Brian Wilson: Long Promised Road is a 2021 documentary film about the Beach Boys' co-founder Brian Wilson directed by Brent Wilson (no relation). It follows Brian and Rolling Stone editor Jason Fine as they drive around Los Angeles and visit locations from Brian's past, interspersed with footage from recording sessions and comments from musical artists about his influence on the industry. The title comes from "Long Promised Road", a song written by Brian's brother Carl Wilson and former band manager Jack Rieley, which figures heavily in the film.

The film was accompanied by the release of a soundtrack album consisting of previously-unreleased recordings by Wilson, several of which dated from his unfinished 1990s collaborations with producer Andy Paley, and one new song, "Right Where I Belong", that Wilson co-wrote with My Morning Jacket frontman Jim James for the film.

Long Promised Road received generally favorable reviews. Critics appreciated the camaraderie between Fine and Wilson; however, Wilson's comments were believed to be as superficial and non-revelatory as his usual latter-day interviews.

Background and content
The project was originally conceived as a straightforward documentary in which Brent interviewed Brian in a room, but this failed, as Brian was unwilling to talk in this format. It was then suggested that the interviews be conducted by Rolling Stone editor Jason Fine, who had previously written articles about Wilson and had been planned to ghostwrite Wilson's second memoir, I Am Brian Wilson. One of Fine's recent articles about Wilson was written from discussions the two had while driving around Los Angeles together. A similar format was adopted for the film, with over 70 hours of footage shot across three weekends.

Long Promised Road also features interspersed excerpts of interviews with industry figures including Bruce Springsteen, Elton John, Jim James, Nick Jonas, Taylor Hawkins, and Jakob Dylan. Brent commented, "I wanted just a few people, a very select group of people, and I wanted a diverse group of people. The idea being that if you’re watching the film ... and you go, ‘What in the world do these people have in common?’ And the only thing they could ever have in common is their love for Brian Wilson." Archival footage, such as home movies provided by the Wilson family, are also included in the film. Brent's first cut of the film lasted two and a half hours, which was ultimately reduced to 95 minutes.

After an interviewer suggested that the film possibly bordered on the exploitative, Fine responded, "All of it is done on Brian's terms and on Brian’s comfort level". According to Brent, "Jason’s success was that he had never forced Brian to talk, you know, it wasn’t like, 'OK, you’ve got your 20-minute interview, you’ve got to get in and get out, you’ve got to ask your questions'.  Brian was always, I think, lovingly patient with us". Wilson's publicist Jean Sievers is credited as the film's co-producer, while Wilson, his wife Melinda, and Fine are credited as the film's executive producers.

Reception
Long Promised Road premiered at the Tribeca Film Festival in June 2021 and was distributed by Screen Media in theaters and on streaming services in November. On review aggregator website Rotten Tomatoes, Long Promised Road holds an approval rating of  based on  reviews. Metacritic, which uses a weighted average, assigned the film a score of 78 out of 100 based on 6 critics, indicating "generally favorable reviews".

Reviewing the film for The Arts Fuse, Jason M. Rubin concluded that the clearest takeaway was that "every single day — practically every single hour — is a struggle for Brian Wilson." Acknowledging Wilson's reputation as "a notoriously bad interview", the writer goes on to say that the film succeeds due to the friendship between Fine and Wilson running deeper than "some fake industry connection ... As a result, Wilson opens up to him in a way he does with few others."

In the assessment of Varietys Owen Gleiberman, "Jason Fine is the easygoing friend who inquires about stuff, fields Brian’s one-sentence answers, never pushes too hard, absorbs Brian’s thoughts and feelings with sympathetic understanding, and talks music with him. He brings Brian out — at least as much as one can." The Playlists Christian Gallichio wrote that it "may not reveal much about Wilson that isn't covered in a Wikipedia article", and does not include insights from Wilson about his "life after his overdoses. While these aspects are understandably glossed over by Wilson, the film is a bit too apt to let Wilson guide the discussions."

National Reviews Kyle Smith found Long Promised Road to be inferior to previous films about Wilson – namely, the "almost definitive" I Just Wasn't Made for These Times and the Love & Mercy biopic. He bemoaned the choice of interviewees (particularly the inclusion of Nick Jonas and the omission of Wilson's family members) as well as the lack of "anything fresh to offer longtime fans", although "it does give a sense of what it might be like to hang out with Wilson today. That sense is largely... frustration." Smith added that the film would have benefited from delving further into "Wilson's crazy asides", such as his remark about the Doobie Brothers' song "What a Fool Believes" scaring "the hell" out of him, or his answer for why he was close with his brother Dennis ("Because we snorted cocaine together!").

Soundtrack

Long Promised Road features a new song by Wilson and My Morning Jacket frontman Jim James, "Right Where I Belong". Wilson's writing contributions were limited to the song's rough melodic ideas; James structured the song, added lyrics, and recorded the track largely by himself. Brent stated that he had asked James to finish the tune, although Fine claimed that Brian himself solicited the collaboration. Brian recorded his vocal parts after recovering from back surgery.

In August 2021, Brent stated that there were tentative plans to release a soundtrack album containing never before released material. The soundtrack was officially announced on November 23 and released by Lakeshore Records on November 26.

References

Further reading

External links
 
 Stream at pbs.org
 
 

Brian Wilson
2021 films
2021 documentary films
American documentary films
Documentary films about mental health
Documentary films about singers
Films about the Beach Boys
Films shot in Los Angeles
2020s American films